Dinesh Chandra Yadav may refer to:
 Dinesh Chandra Yadav (Nepali politician)
 Dinesh Chandra Yadav (Indian politician)